The Battle of Carrickfergus took place in February 1760 in Carrickfergus, Kingdom of Ireland during the Seven Years' War. A force of 600 French troops landed under the command of the Privateer François Thurot, overwhelmed the small garrison of the town, and captured its castle.

When word of the capture reached Dublin, a small force of dragoons was despatched by the Lord Lieutenant Duke of Bedford, who feared, incorrectly, that it was a feint to draw British forces to the north while a main French force was to attack Cork or Dublin. Therefore, the bulk of the Royal Irish Army remained where it was rather than marching to the assistance of Ulster.

Thurot held the town for five days, menacing nearby Belfast and demanding supplies and a ransom. In the face of the mobilisation of large numbers of local militia under General Strode, and the appearance of a Royal Navy squadron off the coast, Thurot re-embarked his force and departed the town.

Thurot was subsequently killed during the Battle of Bishops Court, but his feat in landing on enemy soil was widely hailed in France and he became a national hero, partly because his perceived daring was in sharp contrast to the incompetence shown by French naval officers at the recent Battle of Quiberon Bay.

See also
 Great Britain in the Seven Years War
 France in the Seven Years War

References

Bibliography
 Longmate, Norman. Island Fortress: The Defence of Great Britain, 1603-1945. Harper Collins, 1993
 McLynn, Frank. 1759: The Year Britain Became Master of the World. Pimlico, 2005.
 Rodger NAM. Command of the Ocean: A Naval History of Britain, 1649-1815. Penguin Books, 2006.
Further reading
 

Carrickfergus 1760
Carrickfergus (1760)
Carrickfergus (1760)
1760 in Ireland
Carrickfergus 1760
Carrickfergus
Carrickfergus 1760
French military occupations
18th century in County Antrim